Marvin Rees (born April 1972) is a British Labour Party politician who has served as the Mayor of Bristol since 2016.

Early life and education
Marvin Rees was brought up in Bristol, partly in Lawrence Weston and Easton, by his British mother. He obtained a master's degree in political theory and government at Swansea University, and a master's degree in global economic development at Eastern University in 2000. Later he completed the World Fellows Program at Yale University. During a fellowship he assisted Tony Campolo, an advisor to President Bill Clinton.

Career
Rees has worked in diverse areas throughout his career. He was a freelance journalist and radio presenter at BBC Radio Bristol and Ujima Radio. He was the Communications and Events Manager at Black Development Agency (now Phoenix Social Enterprise), an agency devoted to empowering individuals and communities through opportunities to work abroad.

Rees was employed in the city of Bristol as the programme manager for race equality in mental health issues at Public Health, Bristol.  He worked in the United States as an outreach assistant at the Sojourners Community and as a youth coordinator at Tearfund.

Political career

2012 mayoral election 
In 2012, selected by an individual ballot of Labour Party members in the city to stand for Mayor of Bristol, Rees defeated four other candidates for the nomination, including the Leader and Deputy Leader of the Bristol City Council Labour group and a former Member of Parliament, Dan Norris, who would later become Mayor of the West of England. At the election, he received 25,906 votes, coming second, after George Ferguson, an independent. Rees found it difficult readjusting to normal life following his election loss.

Community involvement
In 2012, Rees was the founder and programme leader at the Bristol Leadership Programme, a two-week programme helping a dozen people annually from impoverished backgrounds to attain their aspirations. He was also a member of the Bristol Legacy Commission which dispersed its funds and ceased operating in April 2012. He is a former director of the Bristol Partnership whose goals are to make Bristol's prosperity sustainable, reduce health and wealth inequality, build stronger and safer communities, and raise the aspirations and achievements of young people and families.

Mayor of Bristol

First term
Rees was again selected to be the Labour candidate for the 2016 mayoral election, easily defeating a sitting Labour councillor in the selection. On 5 May 2016, he was elected Mayor of Bristol. He received 56,729 votes in the first round and 12,021 transfer votes in the second round, giving him 68,750 votes overall. He has been referred to as “the first black mayor of African descent” in the UK.

Rees's term of office started with a £30 million budget shortfall inherited from the previous administration and a £60 million budget deficit from government funding reductions to 2020. In August 2016, Rees instigated a voluntary severance programme aimed at reducing the size of the council's workforce from 6,970 by 1,000. Rees commissioned an independent report by former Audit Commission chief executive Steve Bundred, which criticised senior council officers, leading Rees to say a culture of concealment had previously prevailed so councillors were unaware that agreed savings had not been fully delivered.

Rees had pledged to gradually increase home building in Bristol toward a 2020 target of 2,000 per year, of which 800 would be affordable. Rees oversaw the founding of a city-owned housing company, Goram Homes, created to develop and build homes, re-investing profits to the development of affordable and social housing. From 2016/17 to 2019/20 the outcome was between 1,350 and 1,994 new homes per year, of which between only 188 and 312 per year were affordable. The affordable homes target for 2020/21 was reduced to 500 due to the COVID-19 pandemic. Affordable homes had mostly been built on brownfield land. The council housing manager stated the missed target was delay rather than failure, with at least 1,028 affordable homes expected from current projects in 2022/23.

In the 2020 and 2021 Powerlists, Rees was listed in the Top 100 of the most influential people in the UK of African/African-Caribbean descent.

Bristol Arena
One matter that split public opinion was Rees's decision in September 2018 not to build the long-awaited 10,000 seat Bristol Arena by Temple Meads Station, in the centre of Bristol. The episode brought discussion about the authority of a city mayor to make autonomous decisions in the face of opposition. Concerns were raised at how businesses are able to influence those with decision-making and planning powers in cities.

The main reasons Rees gave for his decision were building cost, financial risk, and job creation. The building cost for the council, which would have had to be borrowed, had increased to £150 million, plus half of any cost overruns. Costs arising should the arena not be successful would fall on the council, and expert advice was that the venue size was too small for major events. Rees also argued that a mixed use development would create more and better-paid jobs. The decision was also heavily influenced by an agreement to secure a 17,000-seat arena in the north of the city, built with private investment at no public cost.

Statue of Edward Colston

In March 2019, Rees vetoed the installation of a second plaque to the statue of the Bristol-born merchant Edward Colston as he rejected the proposed wording as failing to adequately describe Colston's role in the Bristol slave trade.

In the aftermath in 2020 of the murder of George Floyd in Minneapolis, in police custody, global Black Lives Matter protests were held around the world. In Bristol, protestors forcibly removed the statue of Edward Colston and dropped it into the harbour. The statue was recovered from the harbour by Bristol City Council, and Rees announced it would end up in a Bristol museum, where the full history of the statue could be told. The events placed Bristol in the forefront of global news, including the major news channels in the UK and US. Rees announced a new commission on Bristol's history, so that there could be a wider understanding of the city's history, including struggles on class, race and gender. A fly-on-the-wall BBC documentary, called Statue Wars, was broadcast in June 2021, showing events in the Mayor's office as Rees managed the fall-out around the removal of the Colston statue.

On 9 December 2020, four people — often referred to as the "Colston 4" — were charged with causing criminal damage in relation to the toppling of the statue. In a trial at Bristol Crown Court, the defendants admitted they took part in the removal of the statue, but argued that it was justified. On 5 January 2022, the jury found the defendants not guilty of an offence.

After the trial, Rees received criticism for not acting sooner to remove the statue, thereby preventing the outbreak of anger. Rees argued he had made a choice to expend his political capital on employment, housing, education, and tackling racism rather than a contentious symbolic matter. He noted that action was being taken elsewhere, pointing to the name change of the Colston Hall which had already been committed to before the controversy surrounding Edward Colston gained nation-wide attention, so that the venue would no longer be associated with Colston's values and actions. Rees said he was pleased that the statue of Colston was no longer there.

Second term

Rees's mayoral term was due to expire in May 2020, but the next election was delayed for 12, months due to the COVID-19 pandemic. The mayoral election took place in May 2021, and Rees was re-elected with 56.5% of the votes in a second round against the Green Party candidate, who won 43.5%. The Green Party made large gains in councillors, so Labour lost overall control of the council, with Labour and Greens both having 24 councillors.

Rees made a key election pledge to increase the new homes target for 2024 to 2,000 new homes per year, 1,000 of them affordable. In November 2021 Rees created the 'Project 1000' board to oversee the development of an affordable homes delivery plan.

In October 2020, Rees was awarded an honorary fellowship by the Royal Institute of British Architects for his work as a "city maker".

In May 2022, a referendum took place in Bristol to decide if the city should continue being run by a mayor or a council-led committee system. The city voted 59% in favour of abolishing the post, on a 29% turnout.  Rees will continue to serve as mayor until 2024, after which the new committee system will start.

In June 2022 Rees was criticised for taking a  flight to Vancouver to speak about climate change at a TED event. After Rees was asked about the "irony" of this act, by a Local Democracy Reporting Service reporter, his council's head of external communications, Saskia Konynenburg, challenged the line taken and whether it was appropriate for a LDRS reporter, rather than “a journalist from a newspaper”, to be asking the question. Shortly afterwards it was reported that LDRS staff would not be allowed to attend the mayor's future press conferences, resulting in a boycott of those events by several local news outlets, as well as the BBC and ITV.

On 6 July 2022, Rees announced that a Clean Air Zone for central Bristol would start on 28 November 2022. It would impose charges on more polluting older petrol and diesel vehicles, currently about a quarter of vehicles using the zone area.

Personal life 
Marvin Rees describes himself as the mixed-race son of a Jamaican father and white single mother, and was born and grew up in Bristol in financially difficult circumstances. According to Rees, his paternal four-times-great-grandfather was executed by the colonial Jamaican government for participating in the 1865 Morant Bay rebellion. He is married with three children and lives in Easton in Bristol.

In 2018 a documentary film was released with a premiere at Watershed, Bristol, about Rees's journey into politics and his two campaigns for the city's top political job. The Mayor's Race was filmed between 2011 and 2017, covering Rees's two mayoral campaigns in 2012 and 2016 as well as Bristol's historical issues of race and racism—including the 1963 bus boycott, the 1980 St Pauls riot, and the Bristol slave trade.

Rees is a Christian.

References

1972 births
Living people
Alumni of Swansea University
Eastern University (United States) alumni
Black British politicians
Labour Party (UK) mayors
Mayors of Bristol
British people of Jamaican descent